Kangelo Castle is a historical fortress located in Kangelo Village, Savadkuh County, Mazandaran Province, Iran. Kangelo Castle was built during the time of the Sassanian Empire. According to historians, this castle was used as a place to worship the Mithra.

References

Castles in Iran
Buildings and structures in Mazandaran Province
National works of Iran
Sasanian castles